The Tony Nancy Wedge was the name given to two streamliner dragsters (also referred to as Wedge I and Wedge II) built for drag racer Tony Nancy.

Designed by Steve Swaja in 1963, they were built to race in the NHRA's AA/Gas (A/Gas supercharged) class.  The aluminum body was built by Emil Deidt (formerly of Scarab, who came out of retirement for the job ) and Wayne Ewing, on an RCS chassis, with a  wheelbase (as insisted on by Nancy).   It had a narrow rear end (intended to help keep the car running in a straight line) on a twin torsion bar rear suspension, and straight front axle with bicycle wheels (with a  tread), a pointed-nosed body covering both slicks, and mid-mounted engine, with exhaust pipes out the underside of the body ahead of the rear tires.

In theory, the wedge body offered an aerodynamic advantage, decreasing turbulent airflow over the rear wheels, as well as increasing downforce; in practice, the extra weight exceeded any advantage.

Wedge I was powered by a supercharged  Plymouth hemi and originally painted orange. Wedge I first appeared at the 1964 Winternationals to pass scrutineering. The car ran for the first time in March, 1964, after being painted white. (This phenomenon, later common to rear-engine dragsters, would come to be known as "blowover".)

At the 1964 Hot Rod Magazine Championship Drag Races, Wedge I set the low e.t. (elapsed time) of the meet at 8.51 seconds.

Wedge II was modified, with slots above the slicks to allow air trapped under the car to escape and rear suspension deleted, while the wheelbase was also extended. Nancy powered the car with a selection of blown engines:  a Plymouth, then a Chrysler hemi, and finally an Olds.

Wedge II was later stored, while Nancy purchased a more conventional slingshot car, and subsequently restored.

In Wedge II trim, the car was auctioned at Monterey, California, in 2007.

Notes

Sources
Taylor, Thom.  "Beauty Beyond the Twilight Zone" in Hot Rod, April 2017, pp. 30–43.

1960s cars
Drag racing cars
Rear-wheel-drive vehicles